World No. 1 Lindsay Davenport was the two-time defending champion, but lost in the final to world No. 2 Maria Sharapova, who won 6–1, 3–6, 7–6(7–5).

Seeds
The top four seeds received a bye into the second round.

Draw

Finals

Top half

Bottom half

References

External links
 Main Draw and Qualifying Draw

2005 Singles
Toray Pan Pacific Open - Singles
2005 Toray Pan Pacific Open